Gürpınar is a village in the Kozluk District, Batman Province, Turkey. Its population is 554 (2021).

The hamlets of Başpınar, Gültepe and Ulucanlar are attached to the village.

References

Villages in Kozluk District

Kurdish settlements in Batman Province